No World Order is the seventh full-length album by the German power metal band Gamma Ray released in 2001. A music video was made for the song "Eagle".

Track listing

Personnel 
 Kai Hansen - vocals, electric guitars
 Henjo Richter - Electric and acoustic guitars, keyboards
 Dirk Schlächter - bass
 Dan Zimmermann - drums

Production
 Mixed at: Hansen Studio, Hamburg, Germany
 Engineered by: Dirk Schlächter, Kai Hansen

Charts

Credits
 Cover Painting by: Hervé Monjeaud
 Digital Artwork and Booklet-design by: Henjo Richter

References

2001 albums
Gamma Ray (band) albums
Albums produced by Kai Hansen